Tmesisternus rotundipennis is a species of beetle in the family Cerambycidae. It was described by Stephan von Breuning in 1948. It is known from Papua New Guinea.

References

rotundipennis
Beetles described in 1948